Rodrigo Muñoz (floruit 1073–23 October 1086) was a Galician count in the Kingdom of León, best known for his death at the Battle of Sagrajas fighting for Alfonso VI of León.

As related by chronicler Pelagius of Oviedo, Rodrigo was son of count Munio Rodríguez by Jimena Ordoñez, a granddaughter of Vermudo II of León via his illegitimate son Ordoño.  His paternal grandfather, count Rodrigo Romàniz, was nephew of rebel count Suero Gundemáriz and had himself rebelled against king Vermudo III.  Rodrigo's father, Munio Rodríguez, had in turn briefly rebelled against Fernando I of León and was forced by the king's soldiers to flee into the mountains.  Rodrigo Muñoz was closely related to the House of Traba and the Vela family of Bermudo Ovéquiz, both of which also descended from Rodrigo Romàniz.  He had a full-brother, Suero Muñoz, and by his father's second marriage to Ilduara Velázquez, a half-sister Elvira Muñoz, wife of count Pelayo Gómez of the powerful Banu Gómez clan.  His family had been benefactors of the monastery of Santa Maria de Ferreira de Pallares from its foundation in the tenth century.

Rodrigo Muñoz first appears in 1073, when he joined his parents and the entire court in confirming a donation made by Pelayo, Bishop of León.  Just two years later he appears as count when he confirmed a donation made by Alfonso VI.  He appears on additional royal grants in 1080 and 1082, in the latter charter as Rodericus Muniz Gallecie (Rodrigo Muñoz the Galician), a style that highlights his importance at court.  He last is found witnessing a document in 1085.  Pelagius of Oviedo reports that he was killed at the Battle of Sagrajas.  Fought on 23 October 1086 between the armies of Alfonso VI and the Almoravid king Yusuf ibn Tashfin, the battle resulted in a decisive Leonese defeat and the loss of a significant portion of Alfonso's army, though Rodrigo is one of the few dead explicitly named.  Their own heavy casualties prevented the Almoravids from being able to capitalize on their victory, but it brought an end to Alfonso's expansion at the expense of the Muslim south.

Nothing is known of Rodrigo's marriage, but a 13th-century account of the Santa Maria de Ferreira de Pallares benefactors gives him a daughter, Mayor Rodríguez, mother (by count Fernando Núñez) of Fronilde Fernández, the wife of count Rodrigo Pérez de Traba.

Notes

References

Bibliography

 
 
 
 

11th-century births
1086 deaths
Year of birth unknown
11th-century nobility from the Kingdom of León
People of the Reconquista
Spanish military personnel killed in action